Galgos de Tijuana (English: Tijuana Greyhounds) are an American football team based in Tijuana, Mexico. The Galgos compete in the Liga de Fútbol Americano Profesional (LFA), the top American football league in Mexico. The team plays its home games at the Estadio Caliente.

History
On 9 November 2021, LFA commissioner Alejandro Jaimes announced a franchise in Tijuana would be joining the Reyes de Jalisco as one of the two expansion teams ahead of the 2022 season. 

Galgos de Tijuana was established on 17 November, revealing their name, logo and uniforms. The project was undertaken in part by Grupo Caliente, owners of Club Tijuana. Guillermo Ruiz Burguete was announced as the first head coach while wide receiver Luis Araujo was their "franchise player". The first tryout was held at the  Tijuana campus just a few days later, with over 100 player attending. The inaugural roster included 17 players from colleges in Tijuana, three from Ensenada and three from Mexicali.

The Galgos played their first game on 4 March 2022, kicking off the 2022 season against fellow expansion team Gallos Negros de Querétaro at the Estadio Caliente with a 9–33 loss. Paul Ortíz kicked a first-quarter field goal for the first points in team history, while Alejandro Meléndez threw the team's first-ever touchdown to Cody Smith in the game's closing minutes. Galgos ended the 2022 season with a 0–6 record, becoming the first LFA team to finish a season with no wins.

On 4 January 2023, Héctor del Águila was announced as the head coach for the 2023 season.

Galgos achieved their first victory ever in their first game of the 2023 LFA season against Mexicas de la Ciudad de México, 24–6.

Roster

Season-by-season

References

Liga de Fútbol Americano Profesional teams
Sports teams in Tijuana
American football teams established in 2021
2021 establishments in Mexico